Horr is a book by the Iranian author Ali Shariati.

Horr may also refer to:
Head of the River Race (HORR), a processional rowing race held annually on the Thames in London
Roswell G. Horr (1830–1896), U.S. Representative from Michigan
Ralph Horr (1884–1960), U.S. Representative from Washington
Horr, Iran, a city in Khuzestan Province
Horr Rural District, in Kermanshah Province, Iran